The Diplomat is a British political thriller series written by Ben Richards and directed by Jill Robertson and Jenny Paddon. It stars Sophie Rundle as Laura Simmonds, a diplomat living in Barcelona, Spain, who works to protect several British nationals who finds themselves in trouble. The series is produced by BBC Studios and World Productions for Alibi. It began airing on 28 February 2023.

Plot
The series follows British diplomat Laura Simmonds (Sophie Rundle), who, with her Barcelona Consul colleague and friend Alba (Serena Manteghi), is determined to fight in order to protect British nationals who are involved in a series of conflicts in Barcelona.

Cast
 Sophie Rundle as Laura Simmonds
 Serena Manteghi as Alba Ortiz
 Dylan Brady as Carl Hyndley
 Laia Costa as Mariona Cabell
 Steven Cree as Sam Henderson
 Danny Sapani as Colin Sutherland
 Isak Férriz as Inspector Castells
 Bert Seymour as Seth Miller
 Philipp Boos as Fabian Hartmann

Production

Development 
On 8 July 2020, The Diplomat was commissioned by British pay television channel Alibi in partnership with BBC Studios as the third UKTV Original for Alibi. Executive producer and UKTV drama commissioner, Philippa Collie Cousins stated that both main characters [Laura Simmonds and Alba Ortiz] "are contrasting professional working women dealing with murder, abductions and organised crime alongside managing their careers and love lives." In regards to the writing and storyline, Cousins stated that "it is The Good Wife meets Spooks for 2021, a feisty workplace drama set in Barcelona with cracking dialogue, abundant crime and a surprising series arc. Television to stay in for by the very talented Ben Richards. I am very excited to work with such an expert lead writer as Ben, but equally excited to add talented up and coming writers to the writing team."

Casting 
On 25 April 2022, Sophie Rundle was cast as lead character Laura Simmonds.

Filming 
Filming began in April 2022 in Barcelona, Spain.

Episodes

References

External links
 
 

2023 British television series debuts
2020s British crime drama television series
2020s British political television series
British political drama television series
British thriller television series
English-language television shows
Television series by BBC Studios
Television series by World Productions
Television shows set in Barcelona
Television shows filmed in Spain
UKTV original programming
Works about diplomats